George Bruff Hammond (October 21, 1903 – February 18, 1981) was an American race car driver from Denver, Colorado. He won the Pikes Peak International Hill Climb in 1952, when he was part of the AAA Championship Car. His victory in the 1952 race was commented on by LIFE magazine: "On Labor Day, he swept to victory in the thrilling and dangerous Pike's Peak Climb, where a slip or a skid could mean death or serious injury, against a field of fast, experienced drivers." 
Hammond has a total of 8 races, between 1947 and 1955 in AAA Championship.

Complete AAA Championship Car results
(key) (Races in bold indicate pole position)

References

1903 births
1981 deaths
Racing drivers from Denver
AAA Championship Car drivers